Sister Carmen Sammut is the former leader of the International Union of Superiors General (UISG) and the superior general of the Missionary Sisters of Our Lady of Africa, known as the White Sisters. She is a Roman Catholic religious sister.

Biography
In May 2013, Sammut was elected as the new president of the International Union of Superiors General (UISG).

Carmen Sammut is Maltese. She spent 28 years as a teacher in Algeria, Tunisia and Mauritania. She speaks fluent Maltese, English, French and Arabic. In 2011, she became Superior General of her order.

See also
Mother Marie-Salomé (Marie-Renée Roudaut), the first Superior General of the Missionary Sisters of Our Lady of Africa

References

Living people
Maltese Roman Catholic religious sisters and nuns
Superiors general
Maltese Roman Catholic missionaries
Female Roman Catholic missionaries
Missionary educators
Roman Catholic missionaries in Algeria
Roman Catholic missionaries in Tunisia
Roman Catholic missionaries in Mauritania
Year of birth missing (living people)
21st-century Christian nuns